Trade is the voluntary exchange of goods, services, or both.

Trade or trading may also refer to:

Geography
 Trade, Tennessee, an unincorporated community, United States
 Trade City, Pennsylvania, an unincorporated community, United States
 Trades, Rhône, a commune, France

Arts, entertainment, and media
 Trade (film), a 2007 film produced by Roland Emmerich and Rosilyn Heller
 Trade, a trading card game
 Trade, in collective card games, is an in-game exchange of cards that doesn't produce card advantage
 Trade paperback (comics), a collection of stories originally published in comic books
 Trade magazine (also called a trade journal, or trade paper, trade publication, or  trade rag), is a magazine or newspaper whose target audience is people who work in a particular trade or industry; the collective term for this area of publishing is the trade press

Occupations and industries
 Trade, or craft, traditional blue and grey collar occupations requiring manual skills and specialized knowledge
 Trade fair (also called an expo or a trade exhibition, or trade show), an exhibition organized so that companies in a specific industry can showcase and demonstrate their latest products and services, meet with industry partners and customers, study activities of rivals, and examine recent market trends and opportunities
 Trade guild, an association of artisans or merchants who oversee the practice of their craft/trade in a particular area

Other uses
 Trade (gay slang), the straight partner of a gay man
 Trade (nightclub), a gay nightclub in London
 Trade (sports), a sports league transaction between sports teams involving the exchange of player rights
 Stock in trade, inventory

See also
 
 
 Collecting, the activity of exchanging collectible items such as stamps or game cards
 Exchange (disambiguation)
 Skin Trade (disambiguation)
 Trader (disambiguation)